Eghajira is a sweet, thick drink made from grain and fruit, usually drunk by the Tuaregs on special occasions. It is normally eaten with a ladle.

See also

 List of porridges

References

African cuisine
Non-alcoholic drinks
Porridges
Tuareg culture